Graham John Clark (born 20 January 1961) is a Scottish former footballer who made six appearances in the English Football League for Darlington and 41 in the Scottish League for Montrose. A midfielder, Clark began his career with Sheffield United without playing for them in the League. He represented Scotland at schoolboy international level.

References

1961 births
Living people
Footballers from Aberdeen
Scottish footballers
Association football midfielders
Sheffield United F.C. players
Darlington F.C. players
Montrose F.C. players
English Football League players
Scottish Football League players